The 1940 Mississippi State Maroons football team represented Mississippi State College during the 1940 college football season. This was Mississippi State's only undefeated season. End Buddy Elrod was be named SEC "Player of the Year" by the Nashville Banner and be selected to several All-America teams.

Schedule

References

Mississippi State
Mississippi State Bulldogs football seasons
Orange Bowl champion seasons
Mississippi State Maroons football